Selfoss Airport  is an airport serving Selfoss, a town on the banks of Ölfusá river in the Árborg municipality in southern Iceland. Selfoss Airport is privately owned.

The Selfoss non-directional beacon (Ident: SE) is located on the field.

See also
Transport in Iceland
List of airports in Iceland

References

External links

OpenStreetMap - Selfoss
OurAirports - Selfoss

Airports in Iceland
Selfoss